Francis Xavier Castellano (born January 7, 1964) is a United States Navy captain currently assigned as the commanding officer of Center for Surface Combat Systems.

He was executive officer of Vella Gulf from December 2013 to April 2015 and was commanding officer from April 2015 to September 2015.

Early life and education
Castellano graduated from the United States Naval Academy in 1990, earning a Bachelor of Science Degree in History. He has attended the Naval Postgraduate School, earning a Master Of Science Degree in Systems Technology (Joint Command, Control, Communications, Computers, and Intelligence), and the United States Naval War College, earning Master of Arts in National Security and Strategic Studies.

Career
Ashore, he served as an Associate Fellow to the Chief of Naval Operations Strategic Studies Group XVI and as a Surface Warfare Lieutenant Commander – Commander Assignments Officer, Navy Personnel Command (PERS 41). He was also previously  assigned to the Joint Forces Staff College.

Maersk Alabama hijacking

Castellano was the commanding officer of Bainbridge during the April 12, 2009 rescue of Captain Richard Phillips from pirates off the coast of Somalia. On April 12, 2009, Phillips was rescued from his pirate captors.

He is a very, very mature and experienced commanding officer. He's had command previously of one of our navy's patrol craft. So with him being on Bainbridge, I have absolute confidence that he's in the right place at the right time for a reason and that he'll do a great job there."

Castellano stated that as the winds picked up, tensions rose among the pirates and "we calmed them" and persuaded the pirates to be towed by Bainbridge. Vice Admiral William E. Gortney reported the rescue began when Castellano determined that Phillips' life was in imminent danger and ordered the action. President Barack Obama had previously given orders to take no action unless it was determined that Phillips' life was in immediate danger.

A reporter summarized Vice Admiral William Gortney's description of the final events: "Just before the shooting, Capt. Phillips was topside of the lifeboat. One pirate was behind him, pointing an AK-47 rifle at him. The head and shoulders of each of the other two pirates were also visible above deck of the enclosed lifeboat. Determining that Phillips might be shot at any moment, the commander ordered the action." Castellano stated, "[We] ultimately believed the pirates were about to kill the captain. That's what was the decision point."

U.S. Navy SEAL snipers on Bainbridges fantail opened fire and killed the three pirates remaining in the lifeboat. Bainbridge had the lifeboat under tow approximately  astern at the time. A fourth pirate was aboard Bainbridge negotiating a ransom and was taken prisoner.

Awards and decorations
  Surface Warfare Officer Insignia
  Defense Meritorious Service Medal 
  Meritorious Service Medal (4)
  Joint Service Commendation Medal
  Navy and Marine Corps Commendation Medal (3)

Personal life
Castellano is a Roman Catholic. At his parish of Our Lady of Mount Carmel Catholic Church in Patchogue, he served in turn as an altar boy, usher, lector, and Extraordinary Minister of Holy Communion. Castellano is a member of the Knights of Columbus Patchogue, N.Y., Council 725.

In popular culture
 Castellano is portrayed by actor Yul Vazquez in the 2013 film, Captain Phillips.

References

External links
 Official USS Bainbridge website 

1964 births
Living people
United States Naval Academy alumni
United States Navy officers
Naval Postgraduate School alumni
Naval War College alumni